Sinzhany is a rural locality (a selo) in Danilovskoye Rural Settlement, Melenkovsky District, Vladimir Oblast, Russia. The population was 276 as of 2010. There are 8 streets.

Geography 
Sinzhany is located 21 km northwest of Melenki (the district's administrative centre) by road. Sofronovo is the nearest rural locality.

References 

Rural localities in Melenkovsky District
Melenkovsky Uyezd